Cedar River (also known as the Big Cedar River) is a  river in the U.S. state of Michigan.


Tributaries and features 
From the mouth:
 (left) Walton River
 (right) Westman Lake
 North Lake
 Crystal Brook
 Weary Creek
 Big Brook
 (left) Little Lake
 Hayward Lake
 Hayward Creek
 Myers Lake
 (right) Baird Creek
 (right) Grant Brook
 (left) Wagner Lake
 (left) Elwood Creek
 (left) West Ellwood Creek
 (right) Mill Creek
 (right) Dry Creek
 (left) Devils Creek
 (right) Camp H Creek
 (left) Crawford Creek
 (right) Brill Brook
 (right) Degraves Creek (also known as Degroves Creek)
 (left) Collard Creek
 (left) Crooked Creek
 (right) Depas Creek
 (left) Advent Creek
 (left) Mashek Creek
 (left) Brook Creek
 (right) Knap Creek
 Kitchners Lake
 (left) Gordon Creek
 (right) Houle Creek
 (right) Fortyseven Mile Creek
 (right) Whitney Creek
 (left) Gorginski Creek
 (right) Wilson Creek
 (right) Arnold Lake
 (right) Indian Creek
 Indian Lake
 Little Indian Lake
 (left) Reed Brook
 Reed Lake
 (left) Alder Brook
 Wheeler Lake
 (left) West Branch Cedar River
 (left) Beaver Dam Creek
 (left) Menard Creek
 (left) Lake Number Eighteen
 (left) Vega Creek
 (right) Spruce Creek
 Spruce Lake
 (left) Pittsburg Creek
 (left) Labre Creek
 (left) Nacomis Creek

Drainage basin 
The Cedar River drains all or portions of the following:

 Delta County
 Bark River Township
 Menominee County
 Cedarville Township
 Daggett Township
 Gourley Township
 Harris Township
 Ingallston Township
 Meyer Township
 Nadeau Township
 Village of Powers
 Spalding Township
 Stephenson Township

References 

Rivers of Michigan
Rivers of Menominee County, Michigan
Tributaries of Lake Michigan